Southard Field Airport  is a small airport located about 2 miles from Bieber, Lassen County, California. The airport is owned by Lassen County and is served by a single 2980 ft asphalt runway.

References 

Airports in Lassen County, California